Chernyakovo is a rural locality (a village) in Pyatovskoye Rural Settlement, Totemsky District, Vologda Oblast, Russia. The population was 328 as of 2002. There are 6 streets.

Geography 
Chernyakovo is located 2 km southeast of Totma (the district's administrative centre) by road. Malaya Popovskaya is the nearest rural locality.

References 

Rural localities in Totemsky District